Tilak Bridge railway station is a railway station in New Delhi. Its code is TKJ. The station is part of the Delhi Suburban Railway. The station consists of four platforms. Construction of additional 5th and 6th new railway line is happening between Tilak Bridge and New Delhi to enhance capacity of already saturated tracks. With this three additional platforms have been constructed (new platform 6 and 7 would be an island platform ) at Tilak Bridge. This will take the total number of platforms to seven.

Trains 

Some of the trains that run from Tilak Bridge are :

 Udyan Abha Toofan Express -discontinued
 Saharanpur - Delhi Passenger
 Rewari - Meerut Cantt. Passenger
 Panipat - Ghaziabad MEMU
 Old Delhi - Agra Cantt. Passenger
 New Delhi - Bareilly Intercity Express
 Kurukshetra - Hazrat Nizamuddin MEMU
 Hazrat Nizamuddin - Kurukshetra MEMU
 Hazrat Nizamuddin - Rohtak Passenger
 Hazrat Nizamuddin - Bulandshahr Passenger
 Dehradun - New Delhi Jan Shatabdi Express
 Tilak Bridge - Rewari Passenger
 Sirsa Express

See also

 Adarsh Nagar metro station
 Hazrat Nizamuddin railway station
 New Delhi Railway Station
 Delhi Junction Railway station
 Anand Vihar Railway Terminal
 Sarai Rohilla Railway Station
 Delhi Metro

References

External links

Railway stations in New Delhi district
Delhi railway division
Memorials to Bal Gangadhar Tilak